FabricLive.44 is a 2009 album by Commix. The album was released as part of the FabricLive Mix Series. It was awarded Best Compilation in Best of British awards 2009 by DJ Mag.

Track listing
  Commix - Life We Live - Soul:R
  Rufige Kru - Sometime Sad Day - Metalheadz
  D-Bridge - Creatures of Habit - Exit
  Alix Perez - The Reckoning - Alix Perez
  Data - The Causeway - Influence
  Logistics - Murderation - Hospital
  Commix - Justified - Metalheadz
  Spectrasoul - Buried - 31 Records
  Calibre - Can't Get Over You - Soul:R
  Lynx & Alix Perez ft. Kemo - Dangerous - Soul:R
  Commix - Belleview (D-Bridge's Belle-reviewed Mix) - Metalheadz
  Spectrasoul & Ben E - Suppression - Spectrasoul
  Calibre - In Denial - Soul:R
  Commix - Bear Music - Hospital
  OAK - No Sunrise - Brand Nu
  Breakage - Old School Ting - Breakage
  Instra:mental - No Future - NonPlus+
  Photek - Yendi - Science
  Instra:mental - Photograph - Darkestral

References

External links
Fabric: FabricLive.44

Fabric (club) albums
Commix albums
2009 compilation albums